The women's 800 metres event at the 2019 European Athletics Indoor Championships was held on 1 March 2019 at 11:10 (heats), on 2 March at 18:06 (semifinals) and on 3 March 2019 at 19:18 (final) local time.

Medalists

Records

Results

Heats

Qualification: First 2 in each heat (Q) and the next 4 fastest (q) advance to the Semifinal.

Semifinals

Qualification: First 3 in each heat (Q) advance to the Final.

Final

References

2019 European Athletics Indoor Championships
800 metres at the European Athletics Indoor Championships